The Sunburst galaxy is a strongly magnified galaxy at redshift z=2.38 (10.9 billion light years) behind the galaxy cluster PSZ1 G311.65-18.48.
The cluster acts as a power magnifier thanks to the gravitational lensing effect. The galaxy cluster distorts the space around it creating different paths for the photons coming from the Sunburst galaxy, that appears up to 12 times. Some of the images are magnified by very large factors. In one of these strongly magnified images of the Sunburst galaxy, astronomers have identified the most luminous star known to date, Godzilla.

References

Galaxies
Gravitational lensing